Jean-François-Marie d'Arquier de Barbegal (1761–1794), also known as de Baumelles, parliamentarian from Aix in the 18th century, was involved in the  of 1793 during the French Revolution.

Biography 
Jean-François-Marie Arquier was born in La Ciotat on 17 June 1761. He is the son of François, Sieur de Barbegal, Lord of Baumelles, and Françoise Richard.  He became advisor to the Parliament in Aix on 28 June 1782.   Later he was initiated into a Masonic lodge in Aix, but remained there only two years, until 1786.   On the eve of the French Revolution, he attended meetings of the nobility for the bailliage of Aix in 1789.

Arquier embraced the  before the Reign of Terror, then was sentenced to death by the Military Commission in Marseille on 26 Pluviose Year II (14 February 1794).

He was guillotined the following day, 27 Pluviose Year II (15 February 1794), in Marseille.

Notes & references

Notes

References

Bibliography

See also 
 Federalist revolts

1761 births
1794 deaths
18th-century French people
People of the French Revolution